) is a neighborhood in the Sants-Montjuïc district of Barcelona, Catalonia (Spain).  The neighborhood is located between Montjuïc mountain and the Avinguda del Paral·lel. It covers around 70 hectares.

The Poble Sec station of the Barcelona Metro is located in, and named after, this neighborhood. It has an estimated population, at the beginning of 2020, of 40,139 inhabitants.

References

Poble-sec, el
Poble-sec, el